"Stronger" is a song recorded and performed by American singer Mary J. Blige, with writing from Esther Dean and Chris Brown, who provide backing vocals. The song was featured on the soundtrack for the LeBron James documentary film More Than a Game, and included on the international version of her ninth studio album, Stronger with Each Tear (2010). It was released as the first single from the soundtrack to iTunes and Amazon on August 18, 2009. Additionally it was sent to US radio on September 8, 2009.

Blige performed the song on Good Morning America on September 11, 2009. She also performed it on the Late Show with David Letterman on September 23, 2009.

Background and release
The song deals with issues surrounding people standing by one another through the difficult times. Blige sings "Now we're stronger... stronger... stronger..." referencing that relationships have more strength once they have been tested and people stand by each other. The song was produced by Polow da Don and Hit-Boy especially for the Music Inspired by More Than a Game which is the official soundtrack album to the film More Than a Game.

Music video
The music video, which premiered on August 21, 2009, features Blige singing in a quarry and amidst clouds. Footage from More Than a Game is interspersed throughout, and the video begins and ends with quotations by LeBron James. The video was directed by Anthony Mandler.

Charts

References

2009 singles
Mary J. Blige songs
Music videos directed by Anthony Mandler
Song recordings produced by Polow da Don
Song recordings produced by Hit-Boy
Songs written by Polow da Don
Songs written by Hit-Boy
Songs written by Ester Dean
Songs written by Chris Brown
2009 songs
Geffen Records singles